The Gölsen is a river in Lower Austria, in the Mostviertel. It is a right tributary of the Traisen.

The river begins in Hainfeld with the confluence of the Fliedersbach and the Ramsaubach (also called the Innere Gölsen). It then flows through the communities of Hainfeld, Rohrbach an der Gölsen, and Sankt Veit an der Gölsen, before discharging into the Traisen at Traisen.

The river is nowadays heavily obstructed due to its recurring floods (Gölsen Dam, 
On account of its recurrent floods, the Gölsen is nowadays carefully controlled (the Gölsen Dam, river bed steps). However, within its broad riverbed, it can form gravel banks.

An extension of the path to the Triesting Valley Cycle Way is planned.

In the past, the line was longer and continued to Kaumberg and farther into the Triesting valley. Since 2004, however, only special trains have operated on this section of line.

References

The information in this article is based on a translation of its German equivalent.

Rivers of Lower Austria
Rivers of Austria